Orville Edwin Langley (October 28, 1908 – September 12, 1973) was a United States district judge of the United States District Court for the Eastern District of Oklahoma.

Education and career

Born on October 28, 1908, in Prague, Oklahoma, Langley received a Bachelor of Science degree from Harvard University in 1932 and a Bachelor of Laws from the University of Tulsa College of Law in 1940. He was in private practice in Muskogee, Oklahoma from 1940 to 1961. He was a United States Army Colonel from 1942 to 1946. He was a member of the Oklahoma House of Representatives from 1949 to 1952. He was the United States Attorney for the Eastern District of Oklahoma from 1961 to 1965.

Federal judicial service

On January 7, 1965, Langley was nominated by President Lyndon B. Johnson to a seat on the United States District Court for the Eastern District of Oklahoma vacated by Judge Eugene Rice. He was confirmed by the United States Senate on January 26, 1965, and received his commission on January 27, 1965. He served as Chief Judge from 1965 to 1973. Langley served in that capacity until his death on September 12, 1973, in Muskogee. Joseph Morris succeeded him in this position.

Family

Orville married Jessie Evans Cosgrove on November 27, 1936. They had one son, James Cosgrove Langley (1941–1983).

References

Sources
 

1908 births
1973 deaths
Democratic Party members of the Oklahoma House of Representatives
Harvard University alumni
University of Tulsa alumni
Judges of the United States District Court for the Eastern District of Oklahoma
United States district court judges appointed by Lyndon B. Johnson
20th-century American judges
United States Army officers
University of Tulsa College of Law alumni
People from Muskogee, Oklahoma
20th-century American politicians